Di-tert-butyl chromate is an alkoxide with the formula CrO2(OC(CH3)3)2.  It is prepared by treatment of t-butanol with chromic anhydride.  It forms red crystals at temperatures below –5 °C, above which it melts to give a red oil. The complex, which is diamagnetic, is of fundamental interest as a model for the intermediates in oxidations of alcohols by chromium(VI).  This complex is stable because as a t-butyl groups lack beta-hydrogens.  This complex and its analogues have tetrahedral geometry at chromium, as established by X-ray crystallography of its analogues.

Applications
It is used as a precursor to chromium-based catalysts, such as the Phillips catalyst, which are employed for the polymerization of ethylene.

Safety
Like other forms of hexavalent chromium, di-tert-butyl chromate is classified as a potential carcinogen by the United States National Institute for Occupational Safety and Health.

References

Chromates
Tert-butyl compounds